Frederick Elphinstone Brown (30 January 1896 – 18 December 1971) was an Australian rules footballer who played with  in the Victorian Football League (VFL).

Family
The son of James Brown (1870–1899) and Janet Brown (1872–1959), nee West, Frederick Elphinstone Brown was born at Hobart on 30 January 1896.

Brown married Lillian Edna Daisy Shillinglaw on 2 September 1916 at St Matthew's Anglican Church in Prahran. Brown and Shillinglaw divorced in 1935 and Brown married Lila Grace Cain, nee Allday, (1905–1986) in 1936.

World War I
Brown enlisted to serve in World War I in February 1917, seeing action in France before returning to Australia in 1919.

Football
After playing with Caulfield Football Club, Brown joined Hawthorn at the start of the 1922 VFA season and he played four games in Hawthorn's first two seasons in the VFL.

Death
Fred Brown died at Caulfield on 18 December 1971 and is burled at Brighton General Cemetery.

Notes

External links 

Fred Brown's playing statistics from The VFA Project

1896 births
Australian rules footballers from Victoria (Australia)
Hawthorn Football Club players
Hawthorn Football Club (VFA) players
1971 deaths
Australian rules footballers from Hobart
Military personnel from Melbourne
Australian military personnel of World War I
Burials in Victoria (Australia)